Lucio Andrice Muandula (born 9 October 1959) is a Mozambican prelate of the Catholic Church who has been bishop of Xai-Xai since 2004. He was president of the Episcopal Conference of Mozambique from 2009 to 2015 and from 2018 to 2021 and president of the Inter-Regional Meeting of the Bishops of Southern Africa (IMBISA) from 2019 to 2022. He has been second vice president of the Symposium of Episcopal Conferences of Africa and Madagascar (SECAM) since 2019.

Biography
Lucio Andrice Muandula was born in Maputo, then known as Lourenço Marques, on 9 October 1959, the second of eleven children. He was ordained a priest on 14 May 1989 by Cardinal Alexandre José Maria dos Santos. He served as parish vicar of the cathedral parish as well as secretary and chancellor of the archdiocese from 1989 to 1991. He was professor of theology at the "Sant'Agostino" Major Seminary for the year 1991–1992.

Studying in Rome from 1992 to 2003, he earned a licentiate in sacred scripture at the Pontifical Biblical Institute and a doctorate in biblical theology at the Pontifical Gregorian University. He returned to Mozambique in July 2003 to become parish priest of the cathedral parish in Maputo and a professor at the "San Pio X" Interdiocesan Theological Seminary.

On 12 July 2004, Pope John Paul II appointed him Bishop of Xai-Xai. He received his episcopal consecration on 24 October from Archbishop emeritus dos Santos, assisted by Francisco Chimoio, Archbishop of Maputo and Júlio Duarte Langa, the retiring bishop of Xai-Xai. He was installed in Xai-Xai on 7 November.

At the synod of bishops on the eucharist on 6 October 2005 he pled for an "urgent and necessary" call for "the fair distribution of priests in the world".

In 2009, he visited the Diocese of Formosa in Argentina, which sends missionaries to Xia-Xia and others areas of Mozambique.

On 31 January 2013, Pope Benedict XVI named him a member of the Pontifical Council for the Pastoral Care of Migrants.

As president of the Episcopal Conference of Mozambique he participated in the 2014 session of the Synod on the Family. On 9 October, he delivered a homily as the morning session began, reflecting on the need to "let ourselves be guided by biblical wisdom" as "we are called to establish a dialogue of faith" even as "one risks losing one's trust in God, to adopt a completely pagan lifestyle".

On 10 November 2018, he was elected president of the Mozambique Bishops Conference.

In July 2019 he was elected to a three-year term as second vice president of SECAM. He was elected to a second term in July 2022.

In September 2019, he was host to Pope Francis, who met privately with a delegation from Xia-Xia in recognition of a pairing established between the Diocese of Xia-Xia and the Archdiocese of Buenos Aires before he became pope.

In 2019 he was elected president of the Inter-Regional Meeting of the Bishops of Southern Africa (IMBISA), and he presided over its 2022 plenary assembly in Namibia.

On 15 March 2023, Cardinal Mario Grech named him to the six-member preparatory commission for the next Synod of Bishops.

References

External links
 Bishop Lucio Andrice Muandula, Catholic Hierarchy 

Living people
1959 births
People from Maputo
Pontifical Biblical Institute alumni
Pontifical Gregorian University alumni